Weather is the tenth studio album by American rock band Huey Lewis and the News, released on February 14, 2020, by New Hulex under license to BMG Rights Management.

The album consists of songs recorded before Lewis' 2018 hearing loss from Ménière's disease. Seven tracks had been completed before work on the album was indefinitely halted, and the band eventually decided to release the record as is.

Development and release
Huey Lewis and the News had not released an album in nearly ten years and had not recorded an album of new material since 2001's Plan B. Plans for a new album had been circulating since 2012 when Lewis announced a new song they wrote called "While We're Young". "But now we need nine more", Lewis explained. While touring in the mid-2010s, the addition of a song titled "Her Love Is Killing Me" had been included in the band's setlist. By the end of 2017, Huey Lewis and the News had recorded a handful of songs for a new album, and it was anticipated that it would be released sometime in 2018.

However, in January 2018, when Huey Lewis was diagnosed with Ménière's disease, the band cancelled all future shows and placed the album on hold. A year later, it was announced the band had signed with BMG to release the new album.

"Her Love Is Killin' Me" was released as the first single in September 2019. In December 2019, "While We're Young" was made available to download and stream along with the announcement of the album's title and  release date of February 14, 2020.

Track listing

Personnel

The News
 Huey Lewis – lead vocals, harmonica
 Johnnie Bamont – baritone saxophone
 Stef Burns – guitar, vocals
 Johnny Colla – guitar, saxophone, sequencing, vocals
 Bill Gibson – drums, vocals
 James Harrah – guitar, vocals
 Sean Hopper – keyboards, vocals
 Marvin McFadden – trumpet
 John Pierce – bass
 Rob Sudduth – tenor saxophone

Additional musicians
 Jeffrey Babko – piano ("I Am There for You")
 Chris Barnes – trumpet ("Remind Me Why I Love You Again")
 Bryan Dyer – backing vocals ("Hurry Back Baby") 
 Niko Ellison – backing vocals ("I Am There for You", "Hurry Back Baby", "Remind Me Why I Love You Again", "Pretty Girls Everywhere")
 John McFee – steel guitar ("One of the Boys")
 Karl Perazzo – percussion ("Remind Me Why I Love You Again")
 Lorin Rowan – backing vocals ("Pretty Girls Everywhere")
 Ric Wilson – guitar ("I Am There for You")

Charts

References

External links
 

2020 albums
Huey Lewis and the News albums
BMG Rights Management albums